Radney Muckleroy Foster (born July 20, 1959) is an American country music singer-songwriter, musician and music producer. Initially a songwriter in Nashville, Tennessee, Foster made his recording debut as part of the Foster & Lloyd duo, recording three studio albums and with nine singles on the country charts.

Foster began his solo career in 1992 and his album Del Rio, TX 1959 produced four consecutive Top 40 hits. However, his commercial success waned with the release subsequent albums such as Labor of Love (1995), See What You Want to See (1999), Are You Ready for the Big Show?, Another Way to Go (2002) and This World We Live In (2006). Overall, Foster has had thirteen songs on the Billboard Hot Country Songs charts, including the Top Ten hits "Just Call Me Lonesome" (#10, 1992) and "Nobody Wins" (#2, 1993). His songs have been recorded by Gary Allan, Sara Evans, Keith Urban, Hootie and the Blowfish, and Jack Ingram.

Early life and education
Foster was born in Del Rio, Texas, as the second of four children. His father was a lawyer who sang and played guitar and by age 12, Foster began playing the guitar as well, and by 14, he began writing songs.

After graduating from high school, Foster attended University of the South in Sewanee, Tennessee, where he became a member of the Gamma Sigma chapter of Phi Gamma Delta. He dropped out in 1979 and at the advice of veteran songwriter Randy Goodrum, moved to Nashville to pursue a music career. Foster later returned to college  and completed his degree, while performing at local venues in his spare time.

Career

1985 to 1990
Foster moved to Nashville in 1985 and found work at MTM Publishing Company as a songwriter. There he met Bill Lloyd and they co-wrote the song "Since I Found You" which became a Top Ten hit for the Sweethearts of the Rodeo. In 1986 Foster formed the duo Foster & Lloyd and they received a recording contract with RCA Records Nashville. Between 1987 and 1990, they recorded three studio albums and had nine singles on the country charts. The highest-peaking of these was their debut single  "Crazy Over You", a No. 4 hit in 1987. The two parted ways in 1990 to pursue solo careers. Later, in 1990, their song "Don't Go Out" was released by Tanya Tucker in 1990 as a duet with T. Graham Brown.

1991 to 2000
Two years later Foster signed with Arista Nashville and released the album Del Rio, TX 1959 (named for Foster's place and year of birth). The album produced two consecutive Top Ten hits: "Just Call Me Lonesome" and "Nobody Wins", which respectively reached No. 10 and No. 2 on the Billboard country charts. Two later singles, "Easier Said Than Done" and "Hammer and Nails", also reached Top 40, peaking at No. 20 and No. 34, respectively.

In 1994, Foster began work on his second album, which was originally to be titled Never Say Die. After the lead single "Labor of Love" failed to make the Top 40, Arista delayed the album's release so that it would not compete with the compilation album Mama's Hungry Eyes: A Tribute to Merle Haggard, to which Foster had contributed the track "The Running Kind". Steve Ripley, who recorded on Arista as lead singer of The Tractors at the time, remixed the following single "Willin' to Walk" and the album was released under the title Labor of Love in April 1995. Later that year, Foster contributed the song "Close Up the Honky Tonks" to the AIDS benefit album Red Hot + Country produced by the Red Hot Organization.

Foster's third album was 1999's See What You Want to See, featuring a more pop-oriented sound and backing vocals from Darius Rucker of Hootie & the Blowfish. The album produced a charting single in "Godspeed (Sweet Dreams)", a duet with Emmylou Harris which peaked at No. 74 on the country charts and was recorded by the Dixie Chicks in 2003. Two of the album's cuts were later covered by Keith Urban, who released his renditions as singles: "Raining on Sunday" from Golden Road, and "I'm In" from Defying Gravity. The latter was also a single for The Kinleys, whose version Foster produced, in 2000.

2001 to 2011
In 2001, Foster signed to Dualtone Records and released Are You Ready for the Big Show?, included the song "Texas in 1880", which Foster had originally recorded as a member of Foster & Lloyd. The new version featured Pat Green and peaked at No. 54 on the country charts. Foster's next album was 2002's Another Way to Go. One of its tracks, "A Real Fine Place to Start" (another collaboration with Ducas) became a No. 1 hit single for Sara Evans on her 2005 album Real Fine Place. Foster's released This World We Live In in 2006 but none of the songs made the country charts. In 2005, Foster released a website-only album titled And Then There's Me: The Back Porch Sessions containing 11 acoustic tracks. Foster produced two albums for the Randy Rogers Band: their 2006 album Just a Matter of Time and 2008's Randy Rogers Band.

Foster began his own music label called Devil's River. In September 2009 Foster released the album Revival under the band name "Radney Foster and the Confessions" and a feature-length DVD documentary on the making of the album.  The 90-minute film was co-produced by Foster and his wife.  Keith Urban recorded Foster's song "I'm In" for his 2009 album Defying Gravity and it became a No. 2 single.

In December 2010, Foster rejoined the Foster & Lloyd duo and they released the album "It's Already Tomorrow" in 2011.

Foster is the host of the music anthology series "Crossroads" on CMT.

2017
In early 2017, Foster starred in Troubadour, a country musical by Sugarland member Kristian Bush and playwright Janece Shaffer. The production took place in Atlanta, at the Tony Award-winning Alliance Theatre. Foster also appears in the 2017 film Beauty Mark.

In September 2017, Foster released For You To See The Stars, a CD/book duo. The collection of short stories is his first print publication and follows the stories on the CD, which included nine new songs and a special re-recording of "Raining on Sunday", Foster's single that was later recorded by Keith Urban for his album Golden Road.

For You To See The Stars is Foster at his classic storytelling best, both as a seasoned singer-songwriter and a soulful writer of prose. Although both components stand alone as separate pieces of art, they are meant to be enjoyed together. When coupled, the book and CD give fans a deeper insight into the subconscious of Foster's storytelling. Long-time Tennessean journalist Peter Cooper commented, “Radney Foster writes with uncommon depth of emotion, humor, empathy, and clarity. I’m going to ask him how he does it, and if he tells me I’ll let you in on his secret. Until then, it’s best that we read, wonder, and revel.”

Personal life
A native of Del Rio, Texas, Foster moved to Tennessee to attend the University of the South at Sewanee. He lives in Nashville with his wife Cyndi and three children, Julien, Jackson, and Maureen.

Discography

Albums

Extended plays

Singles

Guest singles

Music videos

References

External links

1959 births
People from Del Rio, Texas
American male singer-songwriters
American country singer-songwriters
American country record producers
Arista Nashville artists
Dualtone Records artists
Living people
Sewanee: The University of the South alumni
Singer-songwriters from Texas
Country musicians from Texas
Country musicians from Tennessee
Record producers from Texas
Singer-songwriters from Tennessee
Foster & Lloyd members